Mario Soto may refer to:

Mario Soto (footballer, born 1933), Chilean footballer
Mario Soto (footballer, born 1950), Chilean footballer
Mario Soto (baseball) (born 1956), Major League Baseball pitcher